Alessandro Brannetti (born 9 June 1980) is an Italian motorcycle racer.

Career statistics

Grand Prix motorcycle racing

By season

Races by year
(key) (Races in bold indicate pole position, races in italics indicate fastest lap)

Supersport World Championship

Races by year
(key)

External links
 Profile on MotoGP.com
 Profile on WorldSBK.com

1980 births
Living people
People from Fermo
Italian motorcycle racers
125cc World Championship riders
250cc World Championship riders
Supersport World Championship riders
FIM Superstock 1000 Cup riders
Sportspeople from the Province of Fermo